Valerie Jean Solanas (April 9, 1936 – April 25, 1988) was an American radical feminist known for the SCUM Manifesto, which she self-published in 1967, and for her attempt to murder artist Andy Warhol in 1968.

Solanas had a turbulent childhood, reportedly suffering sexual abuse from both her father and grandfather, and experiencing a volatile relationship with her mother and stepfather. She came out as a lesbian in the 1950s. After graduating with a degree in psychology from the University of Maryland, College Park, Solanas relocated to Berkeley. There she began writing the SCUM Manifesto, which urged women to "overthrow the government, eliminate the money system, institute complete automation and destroy the male sex."

In New York City, Solanas asked Warhol to produce her play Up Your Ass, but he claimed to have lost her script, and hired her to perform in his film, I, a Man, by way of compensation. At this time, a Parisian publisher of censored works, Maurice Girodias, offered Solanas a contract, which she interpreted as a conspiracy between him and Warhol to steal her future writings.

On June 3, 1968, Solanas went to The Factory, shot Warhol and art critic Mario Amaya, and attempted to shoot Warhol's manager, Fred Hughes. She then turned herself in to the police. Solanas was charged with attempted murder, assault, and illegal possession of a firearm. She was diagnosed with paranoid schizophrenia and pleaded guilty to "reckless assault with intent to harm," serving a three-year prison sentence, including treatment in a psychiatric hospital. After her release, she continued to promote the SCUM Manifesto. She died in 1988 of pneumonia in San Francisco.

Solanas' views have been described as "unabashed misandry" by Alice Echols.

Early life 
Valerie Solanas was born in 1936 in Ventnor City, New Jersey, to Louis Solanas and Dorothy Marie Biondo. Her father was a bartender and her mother a dental assistant. She had a younger sister, Judith Arlene Solanas Martinez. Her father was born in Montreal, Quebec, Canada, to parents who immigrated from Spain. Her mother was an Italian-American of Genoan and Sicilian descent born in Philadelphia.

Solanas reported that her father regularly sexually abused her. Her parents divorced when she was young, and her mother remarried shortly afterwards. Solanas disliked her stepfather and began rebelling against her mother, becoming a truant. As a child, she wrote insults for children to use on one another, for the cost of a dime. She beat up a girl in high school who was bothering a younger boy, and also hit a nun.

Because of her rebellious behavior, Solanas' mother sent her to be raised by her grandparents in 1949. Solanas reported that her grandfather was a violent alcoholic who often beat her. When she was aged 15, she left her grandparents and became homeless. In 1953, Solanas gave birth to a son, fathered by a married sailor. The child, named David (later David Blackwell by adoption), was taken away and she never saw him again.

Despite this, Solanas graduated from high school on time and earned a degree in psychology from the University of Maryland, College Park, where she was in the Psi Chi Honor Society. While at the University of Maryland, she hosted a call-in radio show where she gave advice on how to combat men. Solanas was an open lesbian, despite the conservative cultural climate of the 1950s.

Solanas attended the University of Minnesota's Graduate School of Psychology, where she worked in the animal research laboratory, before dropping out and moving to attend Berkeley for a few courses. It was during this time that she began writing the SCUM Manifesto.

New York City and the Factory 

In the mid-1960s, Solanas moved to New York City and supported herself through begging and prostitution. In 1965 she wrote two works: an autobiographical short story, "A Young Girl's Primer on How to Attain the Leisure Class", and a play, Up Your Ass, about a young prostitute. According to James Martin Harding, the play is "based on a plot about a woman who 'is a man-hating hustler and panhandler' and who ... ends up killing a man." Harding describes it as more a "provocation than ... a work of dramatic literature" and "rather adolescent and contrived." The short story was published in Cavalier magazine in July 1966. Up Your Ass remained unpublished until 2014.

In 1967, Solanas encountered pop artist Andy Warhol outside his studio, The Factory, and asked him to produce Up Your Ass. He accepted the manuscript for review, told Solanas it was "well typed", and promised to read it. According to Factory lore, Warhol, whose films were often shut down by the police for obscenity, thought the script was so pornographic that it must have been a police trap. Solanas contacted Warhol about the script and was told that he had lost it. He also jokingly offered her a job at the Factory as a typist. Insulted, Solanas demanded money for the lost script. Instead, Warhol paid her $25 to appear in his film I, a Man (1967).

In her role in I, a Man, Solanas leaves the film's title character, played by Tom Baker, to fend for himself, explaining, "I gotta go beat my meat" as she exits the scene. She was satisfied with her experience working with Warhol and her performance in the film, and brought Maurice Girodias, the founder of Olympia Press, to see it. Girodias described her as being "very relaxed and friendly with Warhol." Solanas also had a nonspeaking role in Warhol's film Bikeboy (1967).

SCUM Manifesto 

In 1967, Solanas self-published her best-known work, the SCUM Manifesto, a scathing critique of patriarchal culture. The manifesto's opening words are:

Some authors have argued that the Manifesto is a parody and satirical work targeting patriarchy. According to Harding, Solanas described herself as "a social propagandist," but she denied that the work was "a put on" and insisted that her intent was "dead serious." According to another source, Solanas later wrote that The Manifesto was satirical and "was designed to provoke debate rather than a pratical plan of action". The Manifesto has been translated into over a dozen languages and is excerpted in several feminist anthologies.

While living at the Chelsea Hotel, Solanas introduced herself to Girodias, a fellow resident of the hotel. In August 1967, Girodias and Solanas signed an informal contract stating that she would give Girodias her "next writing, and other writings." In exchange, Girodias paid her $500. Solanas took this to mean that Girodias would own her work. She told Paul Morrissey that "everything I write will be his. He's done this to me ... He's screwed me!" Solanas intended to write a novel based on the SCUM Manifesto and believed that a conspiracy was behind Warhol's failure to return the Up Your Ass script. She suspected that he was coordinating with Girodias to steal her work.

Shooting 

On May 31, 1968, Solanas went to writer Paul Krassner to ask him for $50, which he loaned to her. Krassner later speculated that Solanas could have used the money to buy the gun she used to shoot Warhol, as the shooting occurred just three days later.

According to an unquoted source in The Outlaw Bible of American Literature, on June 3, 1968, at 9:00 a.m., Solanas reportedly arrived at the Hotel Chelsea and asked for Girodias at the desk, only to be told he was gone for the weekend. She remained at the hotel for three hours before heading to the Grove Press, where she asked for Barney Rosset, who was also not available. In her 2014 biography of Solanas, Breanne Fahs argues that it is unlikely that she appeared at the Chelsea Hotel looking for Girodias, speculating that Girodias may have fabricated the account into order to boost sales for the SCUM Manifesto, which he had published.

Fahs states that "the more likely story ... places Valerie at the Actors Studio at 432 West Forty-Fourth Street early that morning." Actress Sylvia Miles states that Solanas appeared at the Actors Studio looking for Lee Strasberg, asking to leave a copy of Up Your Ass for him. Miles said that Solanas "had a different look, a bit tousled, like somebody whose appearance is the last thing on her mind." Miles told Solanas that Strasberg would not be in until the afternoon, accepted the script, and then "shut the door because I knew she was trouble. I didn't know what sort of trouble, but I knew she was trouble."

Fahs records that Solanas then traveled to producer Margo Feiden's (then Margo Eden) residence in Crown Heights, Brooklyn, as she believed that Feiden would be willing to produce Up Your Ass. As related to Fahs, Solanas talked to Feiden for almost four hours, trying to convince her to produce the play and discussing her vision for a world without men. Throughout this time, Feiden repeatedly refused to produce the play. According to Feiden, Solanas then pulled out her gun, and when Feiden again refused to commit to producing the play, she responded, "Yes, you will produce the play because I'll shoot Andy Warhol and that will make me famous and the play famous, and then you'll produce it." As she was leaving Feiden's residence, Solanas handed Feiden a partial copy of an earlier draft of the play and other personal papers.

Fahs describes how Feiden then "frantically called her local police precinct, Andy Warhol's precinct, police headquarters in Lower Manhattan, and the offices of Mayor John Lindsay and Governor Nelson Rockefeller to report what happened and inform them that Solanas was on her way at that very moment to shoot Andy Warhol." In some instances, the police responded that "You can't arrest someone because you believe she is going to kill Andy Warhol," and even asked Feiden, "Listen lady, how would you know what a real gun looked like?" In a 2009 interview with James Barron of The New York Times, Feiden said that she knew Solanas intended to kill Warhol, but could not prevent it. (A New York Times assistant Metro editor responded to an online comment regarding the story, saying that the Times "does not present the account as definitive.")

Solanas proceeded to the Factory and waited outside. Morrissey arrived and asked her what she was doing there, and she replied, "I'm waiting for Andy to get money." Morrissey tried to get rid of her by telling her that Warhol was not coming in that day, but she told him she would wait. At 2:00 p.m. Solanas went up into the studio. Morrissey told her again that Warhol was not coming in and that she had to leave. She left but rode the elevator up and down until Warhol finally boarded it.

Solanas entered The Factory with Warhol, who complimented her on her appearance as she was uncharacteristically wearing makeup. Morrissey told her to leave, threatening to "beat the hell" out of her and throw her out otherwise. The phone rang and Warhol answered while Morrissey went to the bathroom. While Warhol was on the phone, Solanas fired at him three times. Her first two shots missed, but the third went through his spleen, stomach, liver, esophagus, and lungs. She then shot art critic Mario Amaya in the hip. Solanas further tried to shoot Fred Hughes, Warhol's manager, but her gun jammed. Hughes asked her to leave, which she did, leaving behind a paper bag with her address book on a table. Warhol was taken to Columbus–Mother Cabrini Hospital, where he underwent a successful five-hour operation.

Later that day, Solanas turned herself in to police, gave up her gun, and confessed to the shooting, telling an officer that Warhol "had too much control in my life." She was fingerprinted and charged with felonious assault and possession of a deadly weapon. The next morning, the New York Daily News ran the front-page headline: "Actress Shoots Andy Warhol." Solanas demanded a retraction of the statement that she was an actress. The Daily News changed the headline in its later edition and added a quote from Solanas stating, "I'm a writer, not an actress."

At her arraignment in Manhattan Criminal Court, Solanas denied shooting Warhol because he wouldn't produce her play but said "it was for the opposite reason", that "he has a legal claim on my works." She told the judge that "it's not often that I shoot somebody. I didn't do it for nothing. Warhol had tied me up, lock, stock, and barrel. He was going to do something to me which would have ruined me." She declared that she wanted to represent herself and she insisted that she "was right in what I did! I have nothing to regret!" The judge struck Solanas' comments from the court record and had her admitted to Bellevue Hospital for psychiatric observation.

Trial 

After a cursory evaluation, Solanas was declared mentally unstable and transferred to the prison ward of Elmhurst Hospital. She appeared at New York Supreme Court on June 13, 1968. Florynce Kennedy represented her and asked for a writ of habeas corpus, arguing that Solanas was being held inappropriately at Elmhurst. The judge denied the motion and Solanas returned to Elmhurst. On June 28, Solanas was indicted on charges of attempted murder, assault, and illegal possession of a firearm. She was declared "incompetent" in August and sent to Matteawan State Hospital for the Criminally Insane. That same month, Olympia Press published the SCUM Manifesto with essays by Girodias and Krassner.

In January 1969, Solanas underwent psychiatric evaluation and was diagnosed with chronic paranoid schizophrenia. In June, she was deemed fit to stand trial. She represented herself without an attorney and pleaded guilty to "reckless assault with intent to harm." Solanas was sentenced to three years in prison, with one year of time served.

After murder attempt 
The shooting of Warhol propelled Solanas into the public spotlight, prompting a flurry of commentary and opinions in the media. Robert Marmorstein, writing in The Village Voice, declared that Solanas "has dedicated the remainder of her life to the avowed purpose of eliminating every single male from the face of the earth." Norman Mailer called her the "Robespierre of feminism."

Ti-Grace Atkinson, the New York chapter president of the National Organization for Women (NOW), described Solanas as "the first outstanding champion of women's rights" and "a 'heroine' of the feminist movement," and "smuggled [her manifesto] ... out of the mental hospital where Solanas was confined." According to Betty Friedan, the NOW board rejected Atkinson's statement. Atkinson left NOW and founded another feminist organization. According to Friedan, "the media continued to treat Ti-Grace as a leader of the women's movement, despite its repudiation of her." Kennedy, another NOW member, called Solanas "one of the most important spokeswomen of the feminist movement."

English professor Dana Heller argued that Solanas was "very much aware of feminist organizations and activism," but "had no interest in participating in what she often described as 'a civil disobedience luncheon club.'" Heller also stated that Solanas could "reject mainstream liberal feminism for its blind adherence to cultural codes of feminine politeness and decorum which the SCUM Manifesto identifies as the source of women's debased social status."

Solanas and Warhol 
After Solanas was released from the New York State Prison for Women in 1971, she stalked Warhol and others over the telephone and was arrested again in November 1971. She was subsequently institutionalized several times and then drifted into obscurity.

The shooting had a profound impact on Warhol and his art, and security at the Factory became much stronger afterward. For the rest of his life, Warhol lived in fear that Solanas would attack him again. "It was the Cardboard Andy, not the Andy I could love and play with," said close friend and collaborator Billy Name. "He was so sensitized you couldn't put your hand on him without him jumping. I couldn't even love him anymore, because it hurt him to touch him."

Later life 

Solanas may have intended to write an eponymous autobiography. In a 1977 Village Voice interview, she announced a book with her name as the title. The book, possibly intended as a parody, was supposed to deal with the "conspiracy" that led to her imprisonment. In a corrective 1977 Village Voice interview, Solanas said the book would not be autobiographical other than a small portion and that it would be about many things, include proof of statements in the manifesto, and would "deal very intensively with the subject of bullshit," but she said nothing about parody.

In the mid-1970s, according to Heller, Solanas was "apparently homeless" in New York City, "continued to defend her political beliefs and the SCUM Manifesto", and "actively promoted" her new Manifesto revision. In the late 1980s, Ultra Violet tracked down Solanas in northern California and interviewed her over the phone. According to Ultra Violet, Solanas had changed her name to Onz Loh and stated that the August 1968 version of the Manifesto had many errors, unlike her own printed version of October 1967, and that the book had not sold well. Solanas said that until she was informed by Violet, she was unaware of Warhol's death in 1987.

Death 

On April 25, 1988, at the age of 52, Valerie Solanas died of pneumonia at the Bristol Hotel in the Tenderloin district of San Francisco. A building superintendent at the hotel, not on duty that night, had a vague memory of Solanas: "Once, he had to enter her room, and he saw her typing at her desk. There was a pile of typewritten pages beside her. What she was writing and what happened to the manuscript remain a mystery." Her mother burned all her belongings posthumously.

Legacy

Popular culture 
Composer Pauline Oliveros released "To Valerie Solanas and Marilyn Monroe in Recognition of Their Desperation" in 1970. In the work, Oliveros seeks to explore how, "Both women seemed to be desperate and caught in the traps of inequality: Monroe needed to be recognized for her talent as an actress. Solanas wished to be supported for her own creative work."

Actress Lili Taylor played Solanas in the film I Shot Andy Warhol (1996), which focused on Solanas's assassination attempt on Warhol (played by Jared Harris). Taylor won Special Recognition for Outstanding Performance at the Sundance Film Festival for her role. The film's director, Mary Harron, requested permission to use songs by The Velvet Underground but was denied by Lou Reed, who feared that Solanas would be glorified in the film. Six years before the film's release, Reed and John Cale included a song about Solanas, "I Believe," on their concept album about Warhol, Songs for Drella (1990). In "I Believe," Reed sings, "I believe life's serious enough for retribution... I believe being sick is no excuse. And I believe I would've pulled the switch on her myself." Reed believed Solanas was to blame for Warhol's death from a gallbladder infection twenty years after she shot him.

Up Your Ass was rediscovered in 1999 and produced in 2000 by George Coates Performance Works in San Francisco. The copy Warhol had lost was found in a trunk of lighting equipment owned by Billy Name. Coates learned about the rediscovered manuscript while at an exhibition at The Andy Warhol Museum marking the 30th anniversary of the shooting. Coates turned the piece into a musical with an all-female cast. Coates consulted with Solanas' sister, Judith, while writing the piece, and sought to create a "very funny satirist" out of Solanas, not just showing her as Warhol's attempted assassin.

Solanas' life has inspired three plays. Valerie Shoots Andy (2001), by Carson Kreitzer, starred two actors playing a younger (Heather Grayson) and an older (Lynne McCollough) Solanas. Tragedy in Nine Lives (2003), by Karen Houppert, examined the encounter between Solanas and Warhol as a Greek tragedy and starred Juliana Francis as Solanas. Most recently, in 2011, Pop!, a musical by Maggie-Kate Coleman and Anna K. Jacobs, focused mainly on Warhol (played by Tom Story). Rachel Zampelli played Solanas and sang "Big Gun," described as the "evening's strongest number" by The Washington Post.

Swedish author Sara Stridsberg wrote a semi-fictional novel about Solanas called Drömfakulteten (English: The Dream Faculty), published in 2006. The book's narrator visits Solanas toward the end of her life at the Bristol Hotel. Stridsberg was awarded the Nordic Council's Literature Prize for the book. The novel was later translated into and published in English under the title Valerie, or, The Faculty of Dreams: A Novel in 2019.

Solanas was featured in a 2017 episode of the FX series American Horror Story: Cult, "Valerie Solanas Died for Your Sins: Scumbag." She was played by Lena Dunham. The episode portrayed Solanas as the instigator of most of the Zodiac Killer murders.

Influence and analysis 
Author James Martin Harding explained that, by declaring herself independent from Warhol, after her arrest she "aligned herself with the historical avant-garde's rejection of the traditional structures of bourgeois theater," and that her anti-patriarchal "militant hostility... pushed the avant-garde in radically new directions." Harding believed that Solanas' assassination attempt on Warhol was its own theatrical performance. At the shooting, she left on a table at the Factory a paper bag containing a gun, her address book, and a sanitary napkin. Harding stated that leaving behind the sanitary napkin was part of the performance, and called "attention to basic feminine experiences that were  taboo and tacitly elided within avant-garde circles."

Feminist philosopher Avital Ronell compared Solanas to an array of people: Lorena Bobbitt; a "girl Nietzsche"; Medusa; the Unabomber; and Medea. Ronell believed that Solanas was threatened by the hyper-feminine women of the Factory that Warhol liked and felt lonely because of the rejection she felt due to her own butch androgyny. She believed Solanas was ahead of her time, living in a period before feminist and lesbian activists such as the Guerrilla Girls and the Lesbian Avengers.

Solanas has also been credited with instigating radical feminism. Catherine Lord wrote that "the feminist movement would not have happened without Valerie Solanas." Lord believed that the reissuing of the SCUM Manifesto and the disowning of Solanas by "women's liberation politicos" triggered a wave of radical feminist publications. According to Vivian Gornick, many of the women's liberation activists who initially distanced themselves from Solanas changed their minds a year later, developing the first wave of radical feminism. At the same time, perceptions of Warhol were transformed from largely nonpolitical into political martyrdom because the motive for the shooting was political, according to Harding and Victor Bockris. Solanas' idiosyncratic views on gender are a major focus of Andrea Long Chu's 2019 book, Females.

Fahs describes Solanas as a contradiction that "alienates her from the feminist movement", arguing that Solanas never wanted to be "in movement" but nevertheless fractured the feminist movement by provoking NOW members to disagree about her case. Many contradictions are seen in Solanas' lifestyle as a lesbian who sexually serviced men, her claim to be asexual, a rejection of queer culture, and a non-interest in working with others despite a dependency on others. Fahs also brings into question the contradictory stories of Solanas' life. She is described as a victim, a rebel, and a desperate loner, yet her cousin says she worked as a waitress in her late 20s and 30s, not primarily as a prostitute, and friend Geoffrey LaGear said she had a "groovy childhood." Solanas also kept in touch with her father throughout her life, despite claiming that he sexually abused her. Fahs believes that Solanas embraced these contradictions as a key part of her identity.

In 2018, The New York Times started a series of delayed obituaries of significant individuals whose importance the paper's obituary writers had not recognized at the time of their deaths. In June 2020, they started a series of obituaries on LGBTQ individuals, and on June 26, they profiled Solanas.

Alice Echols stated that Solanas' "unabashed misandry" was not typical within most radical feminist groups during the latter's time.

Works 
 Up Your Ass (1965)
 "A Young Girl's Primer on How to Attain the Leisure Class," Cavalier (1966)
 SCUM Manifesto (1967)

Notes

References

Bibliography

External links 

 
 
 Valerie Solanas The Defiant Life of the Woman Who Wrote SCUM (and Shot Andy Warhol), by Breanne Fahs (2014)
 About Valerie Solanas, by Freddie Baer (1999)
 Whose Soiree Now? , by Alisa Solomon (The Village Voice, February 2001)
 Valerie Jean Solanas (1936–88) (Guardian Unlimited, March 2005)
 
 
 "The Shot That Shattered the Velvet Underground," written June 6, 1968, from The Village Voice archives.

1936 births
1988 deaths
1968 crimes in the United States
20th-century American criminals
20th-century American dramatists and playwrights
20th-century American women writers
American failed assassins
American female criminals
American feminist writers
American non-fiction writers
American people convicted of attempted murder
American people of Canadian descent
American people of Italian descent
American people of Spanish descent
American prostitutes
American women dramatists and playwrights
Burials in Virginia
Criminals from California
Criminals from New Jersey
Deaths from pneumonia in California
Lesbian feminists
Lesbian prostitutes
Lesbian dramatists and playwrights
American lesbian writers
American LGBT dramatists and playwrights
LGBT people from New Jersey
People from Ventnor City, New Jersey
People with schizophrenia
Prisoners and detainees of New York (state)
Radical feminists
University of Maryland, College Park alumni
University of Minnesota alumni
Writers from California
Writers from New Jersey
People associated with The Factory
American women non-fiction writers